The National Guard of Russia are equipped with weapons and military equipment of Soviet and Russian production.

Small arms

Firearms

Explosives

Vehicles

Aircraft

References 

Military equipment of Russia
Russian and Soviet military-related lists
Russia